Eilema lemur is a moth of the subfamily Arctiinae found on Madagascar. It was described by Hervé de Toulgoët in 1954.

References

lemur
Moths described in 1954